The 1986 CONCACAF Under-20 Championship was held in Trinidad and Tobago. It also served as qualification for the 1987 FIFA World Youth Championship.

Qualifying
 Jamaica 2-0 Cuba [on 12 July 1986 at Kingston]
 Cuba 2-0 Jamaica [on 20 July 1986 at Camagüey]

 Suriname 2-0 Netherlands Antilles [on 2 July 1986 at Paramaribo?]
 Suriname 1-0 Netherlands Antilles [on 4 July 1986 at Paramaribo?]

 Barbados 3-1 Grenada [on 15 June 1986 at Bridgetown]
 Grenada 0-1 Barbados [on 22 June 1986 at St. George's]

Other qualification matches may have been played.

Teams
The following teams entered the tournament:

Round 1

Group A

Group B

Final round

Qualification to World Youth Championship
The two best performing teams qualified for the 1987 FIFA World Youth Championship.

External links
Results by RSSSF

CONCACAF Under-20 Championship
1986 in youth association football